Arifin Tasrif (born in Jakarta 19 June 1953) is an Indonesian executive who is the Minister for Energy & Mineral Resources in Joko Widodo's Onward Indonesia Cabinet.

Early life and education
Tasrif attended primary and secondary schools in Jakarta.   He first (1959) entered the Saint Fransikus (Francis of Assisi) primary school in Central Jakarta run by the Yayasan St. Fransiskus (Francis of Assisi Foundation) in Indonesia. Later (1965-1968) he attended the nearby Kanisius middle school before entering senior high school in Medan, North Sumatra in the Yayasan Pendidikan Harapan (Hope for Education Foundation). Tasrif studied chemical engineering at the Bandung Institute of Technology, graduating in 1977. He is of Minangkabau descent.

Career
Tasrif was the business director of the construction and engineering firm  between 1995 and 2001, before becoming president director of the fertilizer company PT Petrokimia Gresik between 2001 and 2010. He then moved to the state-owned . He led the firm until 2015.

On 13 March 2017, Tasrif was appointed as Indonesia's Ambassador to Japan and Micronesia by Joko Widodo. Tasrif had previously worked in Japan for two years starting in 1986 as an engineer. During this period, he was involved in the negotiations for a $20bn contract for a natural gas block with Japanese firm Inpex.

On 23 October 2019, he was appointed as Minister of Energy and Mineral Resources. On 4 February 2022, Tasrif was temporarily replaced with Bahlil Lahadalia as ad interim minister due to a COVID-19 infection.

References

1953 births
Living people
People from Jakarta
Bandung Institute of Technology alumni
Government ministers of Indonesia
Ambassadors of Indonesia to Japan
Minangkabau people
Onward Indonesia Cabinet